Asceua is a genus of Asian ant spiders first described by Tamerlan Thorell in 1887.

Species
, it contains the following species:
Asceua adunca B. S. Zhang & F. Zhang, 2018 — Laos
Asceua amabilis Thorell, 1897 — Myanmar
Asceua anding Zhang, Zhang & Jia, 2012 — China
Asceua bifurca B. S. Zhang & F. Zhang, 2018 — Borneo
Asceua bimaculata (Simon, 1904) — Vietnam
Asceua calciformis (Li, Liu & Peng, 2022) — China
Asceua cingulata (Simon, 1905) — India
Asceua curva B. S. Zhang & F. Zhang, 2018 — Borneo
Asceua daoxian Yin, 2012 — China
Asceua digitata (Li, Liu & Peng, 2022) — China
Asceua dispar (Kulczyński, 1911) — Java
Asceua elegans Thorell, 1887 — Myanmar
Asceua expugnatrix Jocqué, 1995 — Australia
Asceua forcipiformis (Li, Liu & Peng, 2022) — China
Asceua gruezoi Barrion & Litsinger, 1992 — Philippines
Asceua heliophila (Simon, 1893) — Philippines
Asceua japonica (Bösenberg & Strand, 1906) — Japan
Asceua jianfeng Song & Kim, 1997 — China
Asceua kunming Song & Kim, 1997 — China
Asceua lejeunei Jocqué, 1991 — Congo
Asceua longji Barrion-Dupo, Barrion & Heong, 2013 — China
Asceua maculosa Logunov, 2010 — Vietnam
Asceua menglun Song & Kim, 1997 — China
Asceua piperata Ono, 2004 — Laos, Vietnam
Asceua quadrimaculata Zhang, Zhang & Jia, 2012 — China
Asceua quinquestrigata (Simon, 1905) — Java
Asceua radiosa Jocqué, 1986 — Comoros, Mayotte
Asceua septemmaculata (Simon, 1893) — Cambodia
Asceua similis Song & Kim, 1997 — China
Asceua torquata (Simon, 1909) — China, Laos, Vietnam
Asceua trimaculata B. S. Zhang & F. Zhang, 2018 — Malaysia
Asceua wallacei Bosmans & Hillyard, 1990 — Sulawesi
Asceua zodarionina (Simon, 1907) — Guinea-Bissau

References

Zodariidae
Araneomorphae genera
Spiders of Asia
Spiders of Africa
Spiders of Australia